The  is an electric multiple unit (EMU) limited express train type operated by the private railway operator Keihan Electric Railway in Japan since 1989.

Formations
, the fleet consists of ten eight-car trains, formed as follows with four motored ("M") cars and four non-powered trailer ("T") cars.

 The TD car is a bilevel car.
 The MC1 and M1 cars each have two scissors-type pantographs.

Interior

History
The 8000 series trains were introduced between 1989 and 1990, initially operating as seven-car sets. They were lengthened to eight cars per set with the addition of a type 8800 bilevel car from fiscal 1997. Use of the bilevel car does not incur a standalone surcharge.

Between 2008 and 2010, the fleet was repainted in a new colour scheme.

Refurbishment
Between March 2010 and November 2012, the fleet underwent a programme of refurbishment, which also included interior changes.

Car 6 of each set is due to be modified to become a "Premium Car" with 2+1 abreast reclining seating ahead of the introduction of reserved-seating limited express services on 20 August 2017, which incurs a surcharge. Modifications include the elimination of one doorway on each side. AC power outlets are provided for each seat.

References

External links

  

Electric multiple units of Japan
8000 series
Train-related introductions in 1989
Kawasaki multiple units
1500 V DC multiple units of Japan